Mala Loka is a small settlement on the left bank of the Kamnik Bistrica River south of Domžale in the Upper Carniola region of Slovenia.

References

External links

Mala Loka on Geopedia

Populated places in the Municipality of Domžale